Millennial Fair may refer to:
 Millennial Fair, a location in Chrono Trigger
 Millennial Fair, a musical ensemble that recorded Creid